Whitecap 94 is an Indian reserve of the Whitecap Dakota First Nation in Saskatchewan. It is 29 kilometres south of Saskatoon, near Dundurn. In the 2016 Canadian Census, it recorded a population of 451 living in 145 of its 166 total private dwellings. In the same year, its Community Well-Being index was calculated at 73 of 100, compared to 58.4 for the average First Nations community and 77.5 for the average non-Indigenous community.

References

Indian reserves in Saskatchewan
Division No. 11, Saskatchewan